Shamokin Creek is a 32.4-mile (52.1 km) long creek flowing through Northumberland County, Pennsylvania, in the United States, into the Susquehanna River. It has 12 named tributaries, including 11 direct tributaries and one sub-tributary. The tributaries include seven runs and five creeks. The longest are Little Shamokin Creek, Carbon Run, North Branch Shamokin Creek, Coal Run, and Millers Run.

Many of the upper tributaries of Shamokin Creek are in the Western Middle Anthracite Coalfield, and nearly all of the streams in this part of the watershed are impacted by mining, except for Furnace Run. Various mine drainage sites occur in the watersheds of all other streams in the upper Shamokin Creek watershed. None of the tributaries in the lower reaches of the Shamokin Creek watershed are affected by mining. Four tributaries of Shamokin CreekLick Creek, Millers Run, Bennys Run, and Trout Runare not designated as impaired waterbodies by the United States Environmental Protection Agency. Another five tributariesNorth Branch Shamokin Creek, Locust Creek, Quaker Run, Coal Run, and Carbon Run are impaired by metals due to abandoned mine drainage. Furnace Run is impaired by channelization and habitat alteration, while Little Shamokin Creek and its tributary Plum Creek are impaired by siltation, organic enrichment, and low levels of dissolved oxygen.

Although the main stem of Shamokin Creek is designated as a Warmwater Fishery, all of its tributaries are designated as Coldwater Fisheries. Some tributaries, such as North Branch Shamokin Creek and Quaker Run, lack fish life. However, several fish species have been observed in Carbon Run, and downstream tributaries such as Trout Run, Bennys Run, Millers Run, and Lick Creek have supported healthy communities of aquatic life. Additionally, a small fish hatchery is maintained at the mouth of Trout Run by local sportsmen.

Tributaries of Shamokin Creek
Note: Buck Creek, a former stream that is in the Geographic Names Information System, but not on The National Map, is not listed.

Tributaries of Little Shamokin Creek

See also
List of rivers of Pennsylvania

Notes

References

Shamokin Creek

Shamokin